LGA 4677 (Socket E) is a zero insertion force flip-chip land grid array (LGA) CPU socket designed by Intel, compatible with Sapphire Rapids server and workstation processors, which was released in January 2023.

Features 
 Support for PCI Express 5.0
 Supports 8 channels of DDR5 RAM

Chipsets

See also 
 List of Intel microprocessors
 List of Intel chipsets

References 

Intel CPU sockets